Wen Guohui (born September 1963) is a Chinese politician and the current mayor of Guangzhou, Guangzhou Province. 

Wen was born in Jiexi County, Guangdong. He joined the Chinese Communist Party in 1984 and entered South China University of Technology in 1987. In 2001 he served as deputy director of Economic and Trading Committee of Guangdong and director of the State Assets Committee of Guangdong in 2009. Wen was elected the CCP Secretary of Shanwei and Chairman of the Standing Committee of the Shanwei People's Congress. In 2015 he became the Vice-Governor of Guangdong. On 26 January 2016, Wen Guohui was elected the Mayor of Guangzhou.

References

1963 births
Living people
Mayors of Guangzhou
People from Jiexi
People's Republic of China politicians from Guangdong
Chinese Communist Party politicians from Guangdong
South China University of Technology alumni
University of California, Los Angeles alumni
Politicians from Jieyang